The following is a list of notable deaths in January 2020.

Entries for each day are listed alphabetically by surname. A typical entry lists information in the following sequence:

 Name, age, country of citizenship at birth, subsequent country of citizenship (if applicable), reason for notability, cause of death (if known), and reference.

January 2020

1
János Aczél, 95, Hungarian-Canadian mathematician.
Lexii Alijai, 21, American rapper, drug and alcohol overdose.
Chris Barker, 39, English footballer (Barnsley, Cardiff City, Southend United), suicide.
Joan Benson, 94, American keyboard player.
Aleksandr Aleksandrovich Blagonravov, 86, Russian scientist.
George W. Blair, 98, American politician, member of the South Dakota House of Representatives (1979–1986).
Marius Bruat, 89, French footballer.
Günter Brümmer, 86, German canoeist.
Martin Bundi, 87, Swiss politician, president of the National Council (1985–1986).
Carlos De León, 60, Puerto Rican boxer, WBC cruiserweight champion (1980–1982, 1983–1985, 1986–1988, 1989–1990), heart attack.
Alexander Frater, 82, British-Australian travel writer and journalist.
Marty Grebb, 73, American musician (The Buckinghams).
Tommy Hancock, 90, American musician.
Doug Hart, 80, American football player (Green Bay Packers).
Walter Hayman, 93, German-born British mathematician.
Jiao Ruoyu, 104, Chinese politician and diplomat, Mayor of Beijing (1981–1983), Ambassador to Peru (1972–1977) and Iran (1977–1979).
Les Josephson, 77, American football player (Los Angeles Rams).
Don Larsen, 90, American baseball player (New York Yankees, Baltimore Orioles, San Francisco Giants), esophageal cancer.
Bengt Levin, 61, Swedish orienteer, world championship silver medalist (1981).
Peter Lo Su Yin, 96, Malaysian politician, Chief Minister of Sabah (1965–1967).
Aleksandr Manachinsky, 61, Ukrainian Olympic swimmer (1976).
Jim Manning, 76, American baseball player (Minnesota Twins).
Barry McDonald, 79, Australian rugby union player (national team).
Roland Minson, 90, American basketball player (BYU Cougars).
Jimmy Moran, 84, Scottish footballer (Norwich City, Northampton Town, Workington).
Peter Neumann, 88–89, Canadian football player (Hamilton Tiger-Cats).
Ng Jui Ping, 71, Singaporean entrepreneur and army general, Chief of Defence Force (1992–1995), pancreatic cancer.
Chris Pattikawa, 79, Indonesian film director and producer.
Jaap Schröder, 94, Dutch violinist and conductor.
Dick Scott, 96, New Zealand historian.
Katsura Shinnosuke, 66, Japanese rakugoka, acute myeloid leukemia.
David Stern, 77, American sports executive and lawyer, commissioner of the National Basketball Association (1984–2014), brain hemorrhage.
Silva Zurleva, 61, Bulgarian journalist, heart attack.

2
John Baldessari, 88, American conceptual artist.
Fazilatunnesa Bappy, 49, Bangladeshi lawyer and politician, MP (2011–2018), pneumonia.
Daitari Behera, 81, Indian politician, MLA (1974–1977 and 1995–2000).
Tom Buck, 81, American politician, member of the Georgia House of Representatives (1966–2004).
Michel Celaya, 89, French rugby player (national team).
Lorraine Chandler, 73, American singer and songwriter.
Chen Suhou, 83, Chinese politician, Vice Governor of Hainan (1990–1997), Vice Chairman of the Hainan Provincial People's Congress (1997–2003).
Marie Clarke, 104, American labor leader.
Auxence Contout, 94, French Guianese writer.
Mohamed Salah Dembri, 81, Algerian politician, Minister of Foreign Affairs (1993–1996).
R. Kern Eutsler, 100, American United Methodist Church bishop.
Marian Finucane, 69, Irish broadcaster (Liveline, The Marian Finucane Show).
Nick Fish, 61, American politician and lawyer, Portland city commissioner (since 2008), stomach cancer.
Veronika Fitz, 83, German actress (The Vulture Wally, The Spessart Inn, Oh! This Bavaria!).
Bill Graham, 84, Canadian football player (Hamilton Tiger-Cats).
Robert M. Graham, 90, American computer scientist.
Terry Gray, 81, Canadian ice hockey player (St. Louis Blues, Los Angeles Kings).
Edward A. Grouby Jr., 92, American politician, Alabama state representative (1978–1990).
Luciana Guindani, 82, Italian Olympic sprint canoer.
Tom Hickey, 86, Canadian politician, member of the Newfoundland and Labrador House of Assembly (1966–1986).
Gale McArthur, 90, American basketball player (Oklahoma State Cowboys).
Bruce McEwen, 81, American neuroendocrinologist.
Jack McGuire, 86, American politician, member of the Illinois House of Representatives (1990–2012).
Yukiko Miyake, 54, Japanese politician, member of the House of Representatives (2009–2012), suicide by drowning.
Roman Monchenko, 55, Russian rower, Olympic bronze medallist (1996).
George Nicolau, 94, American arbitrator, MLB (1985–1995), NHL (1993–1996), NBA (1979–1981), president of NAA.
Bogusław Polch, 78, Polish artist.
Najwa Qassem, 52, Lebanese journalist and television presenter (Al Arabiya), heart attack.
Élisabeth Rappeneau, 84, French film director (J'ai peur d'oublier) and screenwriter (Lovers Like Us, Une Femme ou Deux).
Jacques Renaud, 96, French racing cyclist.
Ricardo Rosales, 85, Guatemalan politician, head of the Guatemalan Party of Labour (1974–1996).
Edward Spiegel, 88, American physicist.
Shen Yi-ming, 62, Taiwanese Air Force general officer, Chief of the General Staff (since 2019), helicopter crash.
D. P. Tripathi, 67, Indian politician, MP (2012–2018).
Grant Weatherstone, 88, Scottish rugby union player (Edinburgh District, national team).
Barbara Uehling, 87, American educator and university administrator, complications from Alzheimer's disease.
Sam Wyche, 74, American football player (Washington Redskins) and coach (Cincinnati Bengals, Tampa Bay Buccaneers), melanoma.

3
Derek Acorah, 69, English self-styled spiritual medium and television personality (Most Haunted, Derek Acorah's Ghost Towns), sepsis.
Antonis Balomenakis, 65, Greek lawyer and politician, MP (2015–2019).
Christopher Beeny, 78, English actor (Upstairs, Downstairs, In Loving Memory, Last of the Summer Wine).
Robert Blanche, 57, American actor (Leverage, Grimm).
Pete Brewster, 89, American football player (Cleveland Browns, Pittsburgh Steelers) and coach.
Wolfgang Brezinka, 91, German-Austrian educational scientist.
Ninez Cacho-Olivares, 78, Filipino journalist (Daily Tribune), heart attack.
Domenico Corcione, 90, Italian general, Minister of Defence (1995–1996).
Gérard de Sélys, 75, Belgian journalist.
Mónica Echeverría, 99, Chilean journalist, writer and actress.
Ken Fuson, 63, American journalist (The Baltimore Sun, The Des Moines Register), complications from liver disease.
James W. Hennigan Jr., 92, American politician, member of the Massachusetts House of Representatives (1953–1955) and Massachusetts Senate (1955–1965).
Reuben Hersh, 92, American mathematician.
Nathaël Julan, 23, French footballer (Le Havre, Valenciennes, Guingamp), traffic collision.
M. Sakthivel Murugan, Indian politician, MLA (2001–2006), heart attack.
Stella Maris Leverberg, 57, Argentine politician and trade unionist, Deputy (2007–2015), traffic collision.
Penny Morrell, 81, British actress.
Joseph Karr O'Connor, 66, American computer scientist.
Rameshwar Prasad, Indian politician, MLA (1980–1985), kidney disease.
Harvey Reti, 82, Canadian Olympic boxer (1964).
Bernard Ryan Jr., 96, American writer.
Michael Shute, 68, Canadian academic, amyotrophic lateral sclerosis.
Yoshikazu Sunako, 87, Japanese motorcycle and racecar driver.
Douglas N. Walton, 77, Canadian academic.
Bo Winberg, 80, Swedish singer and guitarist.
Notable people killed in the Baghdad International Airport airstrike:
Abu Mahdi al-Muhandis, 65, Iraqi military commander, head of the Popular Mobilization Forces (since 2011).
Qasem Soleimani, 62, Iranian major general, commander of the Quds Force (since 1998).

4
Oliver Batali Albino, 84, South Sudanese politician, heart failure.
Guy Arnold, 87, English writer and explorer, complications from dementia.
Sir Jack Baldwin, 81, British chemist.
Russell Bannock, 100, Canadian fighter ace during World War II.
Byron W. Bender, 90, American linguist.
Herbert Binkert, 96, German football player (1. FC Saarbrücken, Saarland national team) and manager (FC 08 Homburg).
Emanuel Borok, 75, Soviet-born American violinist (Boston Symphony Orchestra, Boston Pops, Dallas Symphony Orchestra), teacher and concertmaster, lung cancer.
Bonnie Burstow, 74, Canadian psychotherapist.
Júlio Castro Caldas, 76, Portuguese lawyer and politician, MP (1980–1983), Minister of National Defence (1999–2001).
Marie-Thérèse Cheroutre, 95, French historian, General Commissioner of Guides de France (1953–1979).
John R. Cunningham, 92, Canadian medical physicist.
Ding Xieping, 81, Chinese mathematician.
Georges Duboeuf, 86, French vintner, stroke.
Károly Gesztesi, 56, Hungarian actor (A Kind of America, The District!, Children of Glory), heart attack.
Emilio Giletti, 90, Italian racing driver.
Gugum Gumbira, 74, Indonesian gamelan composer and orchestra leader.
John W. Hasper, 84, American politician, member of the New York State Assembly (1987–1992).
Junko Hirotani, 63, Japanese singer, breast cancer.
Bill Hobbs, 70, American rower, Olympic silver medalist (1972).
Jiang Hongde, 77, Chinese engineer.
Tom Long, 51, American-born Australian actor (Two Hands, The Dish, The Postcard Bandit), encephalitis.
Lorenza Mazzetti, 92, Italian film director (Together) and novelist.
James Parks Morton, 89, American Episcopal priest and founder of Interfaith Center of New York.
K. S. S. Nambooripad, 84, Indian mathematician, academic and computer scientist.
Walter Ormeño, 93, Peruvian footballer (Club América, Atlante, national team).
P. H. Pandian, 74, Indian politician, MP (1999–2004), heart disease.
Puerto Plata, 96, Dominican musician.
Zdravko Tomac, 82, Croatian politician and writer, MP (1995–2005).
Galia Yishai, 69, Israeli actress and singer, cancer.
Ben Verhagen, 93, Dutch Olympic sailor.
Kiyoshi Yoshimoti, 71, Japanese swordsman.

5
Rubén Almanza, 90, Mexican Olympic basketball player (1952).
James Barber, 79, British biochemist.
T. N. Chaturvedi, 90, Indian civil servant, Governor of Karnataka (2002–2007) and Kerala (2004).
Peter Dyck, 73, Canadian politician, MLA (1995–2011), complications of progressive supranuclear palsy.
Betty Pat Gatliff, 89, American forensic artist, stroke.
Maciej Górski, 75, Polish diplomat, ambassador to Italy (1996–2001) and Greece (2005–2006).
Colin Howson, 74–75, British philosopher.
Guri Ingebrigtsen, 67, Norwegian politician, mayor of Vestvågøy (1999–2007) and Minister of Social Affairs (2000–2001), cancer.
Anri Jergenia, 78, Abkhazian politician, Prime Minister (2001–2002).
Walter Learning, 81, Canadian actor, director and producer, founder of Theatre New Brunswick.
Liu Zhongyi, 89, Chinese politician, Minister of Agriculture (1990–1993).
Danny Masterton, 65, Scottish footballer (Ayr United, Clyde).
John Migneault, 70, Canadian ice hockey player (Philadelphia Blazers, Vancouver Blazers, Phoenix Roadrunners), cancer.
Antoni Morell Mora, 78, Spanish-born Andorran diplomat and writer, ambassador to the Holy See (2005–2010), heart failure.
Sylvia Jukes Morris, 84, British biographer. 
Charles Oguk, 55, Kenyan Olympic hockey player.
Issiaka Ouattara, 53, Ivorian rebel general (First Ivorian Civil War).
Ana Maria Primavesi, 99, Austrian-Brazilian agronomist.
Kamal Singh, 93, Indian politician, MP (1952–1962).
Sir Michael Stear, 81, British Royal Air Force air chief marshal.
Mien Sugandhi, 85, Indonesian politician, member of the People's Representative Council (1977–1993).
Hans Tilkowski, 84, German football player (Westfalia Herne, Borussia Dortmund, West Germany national team) and manager.
Bjørn Unneberg, 91, Norwegian politician.
Peter Wertheimer, 72, Romanian-Israeli flautist, saxophonist and clarinetist, cancer.
David Albin Zywiec Sidor, 72, American-Nicaraguan Roman Catholic prelate, Bishop of Siuna (since 2017), brain tumour.

6
Bernt Andersson, 86, Swedish football player (Djurgården) and manager (Halmstad, Helsingborg).
John Brownjohn, 90, British literary translator.
Ray Byrom, 85, English footballer (Accrington Stanley, Bradford (Park Avenue)).
Cabeção, 89, Brazilian footballer (Corinthians, Portuguesa, national team).
Sir George Cooper, 94, British general, Adjutant-General to the Forces (1981–1984).
Michel Didisheim, 89, Belgian aristocrat and royal secretary.
Duncan Dowson, 91, British engineer.
Mike Fitzpatrick, 56, American politician, member of the U.S. House of Representatives (2005–2007, 2011–2017), melanoma.
Reva Gerstein, 102, Canadian psychologist, educator, and mental health advocate.
Frank Gordon Jr., 90, American jurist, Justice (1975–1992) and Chief Justice (1987–1992) of the Arizona Supreme Court.
Arne Holmgren, 79, Swedish biochemist.
Prem Nath Hoon, 90, Indian military officer, General Officer Commanding-in-Chief of the Western Command (1986–1987).
Ria Irawan, 50, Indonesian actress (Biola Tak Berdawai, Arisan!, Love for Share), lymphoma.
Oswaldo Larriva, 74, Ecuadorian academic and politician, Governor of Azuay Province (2007–2009, 2019) and Deputy (1992–1994, 2013–2017), leukaemia.
Richard Maponya, 99, South African property developer, owner of Maponya Mall.
Aloïse Moudileno Massengo, 86, Congolese politician and lawyer, Vice President (1971–1972).
James Mehaffey, 88, Irish Anglican prelate, Bishop of Derry and Raphoe (1980–2002).
Minati Mishra, 91, Indian classical dancer.
Zacarías Ortiz Rolón, 85, Paraguayan Roman Catholic prelate, Bishop of Concepción en Paraguay (2003–2013).
Akbar Padamsee, 91, Indian painter.
Ivan Salaj, 58, Serbian basketball player (Crvena zvezda).
Alejandro Trujillo, 67, Chilean footballer.

7
André Abadie, 85, French rugby union player (Sporting Club Graulhetois, SC Albi).
Raghunath Singh Anjana, 75, Indian politician, MLA (1990–1993).
Zijad Arslanagić, 83, Bosnian footballer (Sarajevo, Tasmania Berlin, Yugoslavia national team).
Gerald Bowden, 84, British politician, MP (1983–1992).
Vincenzo Cerundolo, 60, Italian medical researcher, lung cancer.
Chang Chiu-hua, 83, Taiwanese politician, mayor (1973–1982) and county magistrate (1989–1993) of Miaoli, liver cancer.
Chi Zhiqiang, 95, Chinese pharmacologist.
Stephen Clements, 47, British radio personality (BBC Radio Ulster), suicide.
Jacques Dessange, 94, French hairdresser.
Fakhruddin G. Ebrahim, 91, Pakistani judge, Attorney General (1971–1977) and Governor of Sindh (1989–1990).
Larry Gogan, 85, Irish broadcaster (RTÉ Gold, RTÉ 2fm).
Bruce Haywood, 94, American educator.
Silvio Horta, 45, American film and television writer (Ugly Betty, Jake 2.0, Urban Legend), suicide by gunshot.
C. Harry Knowles, 91, American physicist and inventor.
Alexandre Matheron, 93, French philosopher.
Harvey Alfred Miller, 91, American botanist.
Jaime Monzó, 73, Spanish Olympic swimmer (1968).
Phil O'Neill, 78, Australian politician, member of the New South Wales Legislative Assembly (1978–1984).
Khamis Al-Owairan, 46, Saudi Arabian footballer (Al-Hilal, Al-Ittihad, national team), brain cancer.
Neil Peart, 67, Canadian Hall of Fame drummer and lyricist (Rush), glioblastoma.
David Penner, 61, Canadian architect, heart attack.
George Perles, 85, American football player and coach (Pittsburgh Steelers, Michigan State Spartans), Parkinson's disease.
Abderrazak Rassaa, 90, Tunisian politician, Minister of Finance (1969–1971).
Ron Rogers, 65, American cartoonist.
Rob Ronayne, 64, New Zealand lawyer and jurist, District Court judge (since 2013).
Fritz Hans Schweingruber, 83, Swiss dendrochronologist.
Colin Seeley, 84, English motorcycle engineer and racer.
Ana Lucrecia Taglioretti, 24, Paraguayan violinist.
R. P. Ulaganambi, 81, Indian politician, MP (1971–1977).
Patrick Welch, 71, American politician, member of the Illinois Senate (1983–2005), complications from a stroke.
Elizabeth Wurtzel, 52, American author (Prozac Nation), LMD as a complication of breast cancer.

8
Haskel Ayers, 83, American auctioneer and politician, member of the Tennessee House of Representatives (1967–1968).
Edd Byrnes, 87, American actor (77 Sunset Strip, Grease) and recording artist ("Kookie, Kookie (Lend Me Your Comb)").
Pat Dalton, 77, Australian footballer (Perth).
Boken Ete, 97, Indian politician, MLA (1978–1980).
Buck Henry, 89, American actor, screenwriter (The Graduate, Get Smart) and director (Heaven Can Wait), heart attack.
Peter T. Kirstein, 86, British computer scientist, brain tumour.
John Lysak, 105, American Olympic canoer.
Madan Mohan, 74, Indian cricketer (Kerala).
David Montgomery, 2nd Viscount Montgomery of Alamein, 91, British peer and businessman, member of the House of Lords (1976–1999, 2005–2015).
Infanta Pilar, Duchess of Badajoz, 83, Spanish royal, Grandee of Spain, colon cancer.
Christine Præsttun, 48, Norwegian television presenter, cancer.
Bill Ray, 83, American photojournalist (Life), heart attack.
Kevin Thompson, 58, American karateka, amyotrophic lateral sclerosis.
Miklós Vető, 83, Hungarian-born French philosopher.
Zhu Yuli, 85, Chinese politician and aerospace executive, General Manager of the Aviation Industry Corporation of China (1993–1999).

9
Tom Alexander, 85, Scottish musician (The Alexander Brothers).
Michael Allison, 61, American composer and musician, cancer.
Jacques de Bauffremont, 97, French prince.
Annette Bezor, 69, Australian painter and feminist.
Walter J. Boyne, 90, American Air Force officer and writer (The Wild Blue: The Novel of the U.S. Air Force).
Galen Cole, 94, American World War II veteran and philanthropist.
Bobby Comstock, 78, American pop singer.
Rudolf de Korte, 83, Dutch politician, Deputy Prime Minister (1986–1989), Minister of Economic Affairs (1986–1989).
Pete Dye, 94, American Hall of Fame golf course designer (TPC at Sawgrass).
David Efird, 45, American philosopher.
Jack Faxon, 83, American politician, member of the Michigan House of Representatives (1965–1971) and the Michigan Senate (1971–1995).
Pampero Firpo, 89, Argentine-American professional wrestler (NWA, WWF).
Greg Gates, 93, American rower, Olympic bronze medalist (1948).
David Glass, 84, American businessman, CEO of Walmart (1988–2000), owner of the Kansas City Royals (2000–2019), complications from pneumonia.
Jo Heng, 59, Singaporean lyricist, lymphoma.
Chukwuemeka Ike, 88, Nigerian writer.
Kermit D. Johnson, 91, American army chaplain.
Euphrase Kezilahabi, 75, Tanzanian novelist, poet and scholar.
Leo Kolber, 90, Canadian politician, Senator (1983–2004), Alzheimer's disease.
Pablo Macera, 90, Peruvian historian.
Robert Molimard, 92, French physician.
Roscoe Nance, 71, American sports journalist (USA Today) and beat writer (NBA, SWAC).
Lan O'Kun, 87, American screenwriter (The Love Boat, Highway to Heaven, Insight), heart failure.
*Breandán Ó Madagáin, 87–88, Irish scholar, writer and Celticist.
Ivan Passer, 86, Czech film director (Born to Win, Cutter's Way, Silver Bears) and screenwriter, pulmonary complications.
Matthew Quashie, 68, Ghanaian naval officer.
Phyllis Rappeport, 90, American pianist.
Mike Resnick, 77, American science fiction writer (The Goddess of Ganymede, Stalking the Unicorn, Kirinyaga), cancer.
Karel Saitl, 95, Czech Olympic weightlifter (1952).
Bergljot Sandvik-Johansen, 97, Norwegian Olympic gymnast (1952).
Jimmy Shields, 88, Northern Irish footballer (Southampton, Headington United, national team).
Hal W. Smith, 89, American baseball player (Baltimore Orioles, Kansas City Athletics, Pittsburgh Pirates).
Iñaki Vicente, 65, Filipino footballer (De La Salle Green Archers, national team), stroke.
Geoff Wilson, 81, Australian nuclear physicist and academic administrator.
Yūji Yamaguchi, Japanese anime director (The Severing Crime Edge, Fate/stay night, Angel Links). (death announced on this date)
Yong Pung How, 93, Singaporean judge, Chief Justice (1990–2006).

10
Brice Armstrong, 84, American voice actor (Dragon Ball, Case Closed, Barney & Friends).
Neda Arnerić, 66, Serbian actress (Shaft in Africa, Venom, The End of the War).
Qaboos bin Said, 79, Omani royal, Sultan (since 1970), colon cancer.
André Capron, 89, French immunologist.
Alun Gwynne Jones, Baron Chalfont, 100, British politician, Minister of State for Foreign Affairs (1964–1970) and member of the House of Lords (1964–2015).
John Crosbie, 88, Canadian politician, MHA (1966–1976), MP (1976–1993), Lieutenant Governor of Newfoundland and Labrador (2008–2013).
Wolfgang Dauner, 84, German jazz pianist and composer.
Bud Fowler, 94, Canadian football player (Toronto Argonauts).
Jørgen Frantzen, 84, Danish Olympic rower.
Dante Frasnelli Tarter, 95, Italian-born Peruvian Roman Catholic prelate, Bishop of Huarí (1967–2001).
Gopinath Gajapati, 76, Indian politician, MP (1989–1996).
Michael Greene, 86, American actor (The Dakotas, To Live and Die in L.A.).
Mozammel Hossain, 79, Bangladeshi politician, MP (1991–1995, 1996–2001, since 2008), kidney disease.
Genshō Imanari, 94, Japanese academic.
Brian James, 76, Australian rugby league player (South Sydney, St. George, national team).
Patrick Jordan, 96, English actor (The Angry Hills, The Marked One, Star Wars). 
Bernard Joly, 85, French politician, Senator (1995–2004).
Roddy Lumsden, 53, Scottish poet, heart attack.
Guido Messina, 89, Italian racing cyclist, Olympic (1952) and world champion (1948, 1953, 1954, 1955, 1956).
P. T. Mohana Krishnan, 84, Indian politician, MLA (1987–1991).
Marc Morgan, 57, Belgian singer-songwriter.
Michael Posluns, 78, Canadian writer and activist.
Petko Petkov, 73, Bulgarian football player (Beroe, Austria Wien, national team) and manager.
Carlos Cuco Rojas, 65, Colombian harpist (Cimarrón).
Jean-Pierre Souche, 92, French Olympic rower (1948, 1952).
Ed Sprague Sr., 74, American baseball player (Oakland Athletics, Milwaukee Brewers, Cincinnati Reds).
Tiny White, 95, New Zealand equestrian.
Wu Shuqing, 88, Chinese economist, President of Peking University (1989–1996).

11
Ahmed Ali, 87, Bangladeshi politician, prostate cancer.
Tom Belsø, 77, Danish motor racing driver, stomach cancer.
Sabine Deitmer, 72, German crime writer.
Jean-René Farthouat, 85, French lawyer and Legion of Honour recipient.
Alana Filippi, 59, French singer and songwriter.
Thomas F. Goldsmith, 80, American politician.
Musharraf Karim, 74, Bangladeshi writer.
Stan Kirsch, 51, American actor (Highlander: The Series), suicide by hanging.
La Parka, 54, Mexican professional wrestler (AAA), kidney failure after wrestling injury.
Norma Michaels, 95, American actress (The King of Queens, Mind of Mencia, Easy A).
Manfred Moore, 69, American football (San Francisco 49ers, Minnesota Vikings) and rugby league (Newtown Jets) player.
Valdir de Moraes, 88, Brazilian football player (Palmeiras, national team) and manager, multiple organ failure.
M. Chidananda Murthy, 88, Indian historian.
Edward Pinkowski, 103, American writer, journalist, and historian.
Fernanda Pires da Silva, 93, Portuguese businesswoman.
Steve Stiles, 76, American cartoonist and writer, cancer.
Hilarion Vendégou, 78, French politician, High Chief of the Isle of Pines (since 1974) and mayor of L'Île-des-Pins (since 1989).
Maceo Woods, 87, American gospel musician and organist.

12
Carlo Azzini, 84, Italian racing cyclist.
Jack Baskin, 100, American philanthropist, engineer, and businessman.
William Bogert, 83, American actor (WarGames, Small Wonder, The Greatest American Hero).
Jackie Brown, 84, Scottish boxer, Commonwealth Games champion (1958), British and Commonwealth flyweight champion (1962–1963).
Brian Clifton, 85, English footballer (Southampton, Grimsby Town, Boston United).
Shlomo Eckstein, 91, Israeli economist and President of Bar-Ilan University (1992–1996).
Mary Evelyn Fredenburg, 97, American nurse and missionary.
Tony Garnett, 83, British film producer (Kes, Earth Girls Are Easy).
Paulo Gonçalves, 40, Portuguese motorcycle rally racer, race crash.
Robert Heinich, 96, American designer and writer.
Rolf Koschorrek, 64, German politician, MP (2005–2013), cancer.
Maurice Kujur, 84, Indian politician, MP (1984–1989).
Francis MacNutt, 94, American priest.
Jayalath Manoratne, 71, Sri Lankan actor (Doo Daruwo, Handaya, Sooriya Arana), brain cancer.
Frank Nervik, 85, Norwegian footballer (Brage, Fredrikstad, national team).
Marc Riolacci, 74, French football director, President of Ligue corse de football.
Kazuo Sakurada, 71, Japanese rikishi, professional wrestler (Stampede Wrestling, CWF, BJPW) and trainer, cardiac arrhythmia.
C. Robert Sarcone, 94, American politician, member of the New Jersey General Assembly (1960–1964) and Senate (1964–1966).
Dick Schnittker, 91, American basketball player (Minneapolis Lakers).
Sir Roger Scruton, 75, British philosopher and author (How to Be a Conservative), editor of The Salisbury Review (1982–2001), lung cancer.
Aart Staartjes, 81, Dutch actor (De Stratemakeropzeeshow, Sesamstraat, Pinkeltje) and television presenter, traffic collision.

13
Jean Delumeau, 96, French historian.
Carlos Girón, 65, Mexican diver, Olympic silver medalist (1980), pneumonia.
Jaime Humberto Hermosillo, 77, Mexican film director (Homework).
Murad Wilfried Hofmann, 88, German diplomat and author, Ambassador to Algeria (1987–1990) and Morocco (1990–1994).
Edmund Ironside, 2nd Baron Ironside, 95, British hereditary peer, naval officer and businessman.
Andrew Kashita, 87, Zambian politician, MP (1974–1975, 1991–1996), Minister of Mines and Industry (1973–1975) and Transport and Communications (1991–1994).
Sophie Kratzer, 30, German Olympic ice hockey player (2014), cancer.
Pierre Lacoste, 95, French admiral, Chief of Directorate-General for External Security (1982–1985).
André Lufwa, 94, Congolese sculptor.
Manmohan Mahapatra, 68, Indian film director (Neeraba Jhada, Klanta Aparahna) and screenwriter.
David Scott Milton, 85, American author and playwright.
Digby Moran, 71, Australian Aboriginal artist.
Maurice Moucheraud, 86, French racing cyclist, Olympic champion (1956).
Ștefan Petrache, 70, Moldovan singer.
Sherwood Price, 91, American actor (The Gray Ghost, Bonanza, Ice Station Zebra).
H. L. Richardson, 92, American politician, Member of the California State Senate (1966–1989), founder of Gun Owners of America.
Jack D. Shanstrom, 87, American jurist, Judge (1990–2001) and Chief Judge (1996–2001) of the U.S. District Court for Montana, Parkinson's disease.
Doug Shedden, 82, Australian politician, member of the New South Wales Legislative Assembly (1987–1999).
Isabel-Clara Simó, 76, Spanish journalist and writer.
Hylda Sims, 87, English folk musician and poet.
Gerald Weisfeld, 79, British retailer, founder of What Every Woman Wants.

14
Nana Akwasi Agyeman, 86, Ghanaian politician, mayor of Kumasi (1977–2001).
Tony Beddison, 71, Australian businessman and philanthropist.
John N. Brandenburg, 90, American lieutenant general.
José Calle, 75, French rugby union footballer.
Steve Martin Caro, 71, American singer (The Left Banke), heart failure.
Nand Lal Chaudhary, 84, Indian politician, MLA (1980–1990).
Chamín Correa, 90, Mexican guitarist.
Kazi Sekendar Ali Dalim, 75, Bangladeshi politician, MP (1996–2001).
Guy Deplus, 95, French clarinetist.
Bernard Diederich, 93, New Zealand-born Haitian journalist, author and historian.
Jan-Olof Ekholm, 88, Swedish crime writer.
Giovanni Gazzinelli, 92, Brazilian physician and scientist.
Eville Gorham, 94, Canadian-American scientist.
Heshimu Jaramogi, 67, American journalist, cancer.
Jack Kehoe, 85, American actor (Serpico, The Sting, The Untouchables), complications from a stroke.
Naděžda Kniplová, 87, Czech operatic soprano.
Liang Jun, 90, Chinese tractor driver and national hero, depicted on the one yuan banknote.
Gudrun Lund, 89, Danish composer.
Carl McNulty, 89, American basketball player (Milwaukee Hawks).
Ritu Nanda, 71, Indian insurance advisor, cancer.
Jerry Norton, 88, American football player (Philadelphia Eagles, Green Bay Packers).
Saidi Shariff, 79, Singaporean politician, MP (1980–1984).

15
Bobby Brown, 96, Scottish Hall of Fame football player (Rangers, Queen's Park) and manager (national team).
Chris Darrow, 75, American musician (Kaleidoscope, Nitty Gritty Dirt Band), stroke.
Frederick Darwent, 92, English bishop.
Mark Harris, 72, Australian rugby league player (Eastern Suburbs, North Sydney Bears, national team), throat cancer.
Rocky Johnson, 75, Canadian Hall of Fame professional wrestler (WWF, Big Time Wrestling, CWF) and trainer, pulmonary embolism.
Julie Malenfant, 46, Canadian athlete.
Bruno Nettl, 89, Czech-born American ethnomusicologist and musicologist.
Abe Piasek, 91, American public speaker.
Katherine W. Phillips, 47, American social scientist and academic, cancer.
Rocky Rosema, 73, American football player (St. Louis Cardinals), dementia.
Victor Salvemini, 73, Australian Paralympic athlete (1972, 1976).
Milovan Stepandić, 65, Serbian basketball coach (Šabac, Metalac, OKK Beograd).
Kotaro Suzumura, 76, Japanese economist, pancreatic cancer.
Ben Swane, 92, Australian nurseryman.
Saša Tešić, 50, Serbian footballer (FK Priština, FK Milicionar).
Nikolai Tsymbal, 94, Russian military officer.
Ivan Ustinov, 100, Russian intelligence officer (NKVD, SMERSH, KGB).
Michael Wheeler, 84, British sprinter, Olympic bronze medalist (1956).
David Wildt, 69, American wildlife biologist.

16
Bernard Grosfilley, 70, French alpine skier.
Maik Hamburger, 88, German writer and dramaturge.
Peter Hammersley, 91, British rear admiral.
Harry G. Haskell Jr., 98, American politician, member of the U.S. House of Representatives (1957–1959), mayor of Wilmington, Delaware (1969–1973).
László Iván, 86, Hungarian psychiatrist and politician, MP (2006–2014).
John Klyberg, 88, British priest, Bishop of Fulham (1985–1996).
Naka Laxmaya, 69, Indian politician, MLA (1980–1985).
Alan Pattillo, 90, British television director (Supercar, Thunderbirds), writer and editor (All Quiet on the Western Front), complications from Parkinson's disease.
Jibon Rahman, 56, Bangladeshi film director.
*Magda al-Sabahi, 88, Egyptian actress (Jamila, the Algerian).
William J. Samarin, 93, American linguist and translator.
Efraín Sánchez, 93, Colombian football player (San Lorenzo, Independiente Medellín, national team) and manager.
R. Sathyanarayana, 93, Indian musicologist.
Gene Schwinger, 87, American basketball player.
Hiroshi Suzuki, 86, Japanese-American jazz trombonist.
Christopher Tolkien, 95, British academic and editor (The Silmarillion, The History of Middle-earth).
Barry Tuckwell, 88, Australian horn player and conductor, heart disease.
Zhao Zhongxiang, 78, Chinese TV presenter (CCTV New Year's Gala).

17
Pietro Anastasi, 71, Italian footballer (Juventus, Inter, national team), amyotrophic lateral sclerosis.
Charles Carrère, 91, Senegalese poet.
Peter Clarricoats, 87, British engineer.
Jacques Desallangre, 84, French politician, Deputy (1997–2012).
Thérèse Dion, 92, Canadian TV cooking show host.
Rahşan Ecevit, 97, Turkish politician, co-founder of the Democratic Left Party.
Derek Fowlds, 82, British actor (Yes Minister, Heartbeat, East of Sudan), heart failure from sepsis.
Fernando Miguel Gil Eisner, 66, Uruguayan Roman Catholic prelate, Bishop of Salto (since 2018).
Grant Goldman, 69, Australian radio announcer (2GB), cancer.
Terence Hallinan, 83, American defense lawyer and prosecutor, District Attorney of San Francisco (1996–2004).
Hwang Sun-hui, 100, North Korean politician, director of the Korean Revolution Museum (since 1990), pneumonia.
Bobby Kay, 70, Canadian professional wrestler (Cormier wrestling family) and promoter (Eastern Sports Association).
Georgi Kutoyan, 38, Armenian lawyer, director of the National Security Service (2016–2018), shot.
Khagendra Thapa Magar, 27, Nepali record holder, world's shortest man (2010–2011), pneumonia.
Bapu Nadkarni, 86, Indian cricketer (national team).
Oswald Oberhuber, 88, Austrian sculptor and painter.
Walter E. Powell, 88, American politician, Ohio state senator (1967–1971), member of the U.S. House of Representatives (1971–1975).
Lech Raczak, 73, Polish theatre director, heart attack.
Steve Rayner, 66, British social scientist, cancer.
Claudio Roditi, 73, Brazilian-born American trumpeter, prostate cancer.
Roger Schneider, 36, Swiss speed skater.
Emanuele Severino, 90, Italian philosopher.
Stanisław Stefanek, 83, Polish Roman Catholic prelate, Bishop of Łomża (1996–2011).
Morimichi Takagi, 78, Japanese Hall of Fame baseball player (Chunichi Dragons), heart failure.
Rhona Wurtele, 97, Canadian Olympic skier (1948).

18
Dan Andrei Aldea, 69, Romanian rock musician (Sfinx), heart attack.
Fernando Báez Sosa, 18, Argentine law student, murdered.
V. Balram, 72, Indian politician, MLA (1996–2004).
Mario Bergamaschi, 91, Italian footballer (Milan, Sampdoria, national team).
Peter Beyerhaus, 90, German Protestant theologian.
Bollin Eric, 21, British racehorse, St Leger winner (2002).
John Burke, 68, Canadian composer and music educator, recipient of the Jules Léger Prize for New Chamber Music (1995).
Cajun Beat, 20, American Thoroughbred racehorse, Breeders' Cup Sprint winner (2003).
Isabel Cabanillas, 26, Mexican artist and activist, shot.
Frieda Rapoport Caplan, 96, American businesswoman.
Ashwini Kumar Chopra, 63, Indian journalist, cricketer and politician, MP (2014–2019), cancer.
Allison Copening, 55, American politician, member of the Nevada Senate (2009–2013).
William C. Davis, 81, American football player (Mount Union Purple Raiders), coach (Adrian Bulldogs) and executive (Philadelphia Eagles), complications from Alzheimer's disease.
Stanley Dudrick, 84, American surgeon.
André Dulait, 82, French politician, Senator (1995–2014), mayor of Ménigoute (2001–2008).
Urs Egger, 66, Swiss film director (Children of the Open Road, Opernball).
Empire Maker, 19, American racehorse, Belmont Stakes winner (2003).
Mohamed Gouider, 79, Tunisian Olympic runner.
Antonia Gransden, 91, English historian and medievalist.
Dr. Hannibal, 56, Canadian professional wrestler (Stampede Wrestling, FMW), heart attack.
Norm Hill, 91, Canadian football player (Calgary Stampeders, Winnipeg Blue Bombers).
Peter Hobday, 82, British news presenter (Today, Newsnight, World at One).
Bubby Jones, 78, American Hall of Fame racing driver.
Egil Krogh, 80, American lawyer, U.S. Under Secretary of Transportation (1973), heart failure.
Robert Maclennan, Baron Maclennan of Rogart, 83, British politician, MP (1966–2001), Leader of the SDP (1987–1988) and President of the Liberal Democrats (1995–1998).
Abdul Mannan, 66, Bangladeshi politician, MP (since 2008), cardiac arrest.
Peter Mathebula, 67, South African WBA flyweight champion boxer (1980–1981).
Roger Nicolet, 88, Belgian-born Canadian engineer (CN Tower, Louvre Pyramid).
David Olney, 71, American singer-songwriter, heart attack.
Petr Pokorný, 86, Czech Protestant theologian.
Robert Sampson, 86, American actor (Bridget Loves Bernie, Re-Animator, Falcon Crest).
Piri Sciascia, 73, New Zealand Māori leader, kapa haka exponent and university administrator.
Abbas Ullah Shikder, 65, Bangladeshi film producer (Beder Meye Josna, Moner Majhe Tumi, Ji Hujur).
Gordon A. Smith, 100, Canadian artist.
Jim Smith, 84, Canadian politician.
Jack Van Impe, 88, American televangelist.
George Herbert Walker III, 88, American businessman, diplomat and philanthropist, Ambassador to Hungary (2003–2006).

19
Charles Alverson, 84, American screenwriter (Jabberwocky).
Kazım Ayvaz, 81, Turkish Greco-Roman wrestler, Olympic champion (1964).
David Chadwick, 93, American clinical and research pediatrician and author.
Herbert W. Chilstrom, 88, American Lutheran bishop.
David Climer, 66, American sports columnist (The Tennessean), cancer.
Manfred Clynes, 94, Austrian-born Australian-American scientist, inventor and musician.
Richard M. Dudley, 81, American mathematician.
Pat Evans, 93–94, Welsh Olympic gymnast (1948).
Fang Shouxian, 87, Chinese accelerator physicist, President of the Institute of High Energy Physics.
Lee Gelber, 81, American urban historian and tour guide.
John Gibson, 60, Canadian ice hockey player (Winnipeg Jets, Toronto Maple Leafs, Los Angeles Kings).
Harold G. Glasgow, 90, American major general.
Bill Greenwood, 77, American television reporter (ABC News).
Chisako Hara, 84, Japanese actress.
Jimmy Heath, 93, American jazz saxophonist (Heath Brothers).
Marilyn Lanfear, 89, American sculptor and performance artist.
David Leach, 91, Australian vice admiral, Chief of the Naval Staff (1982–1985).
Gene London, 88, American children's television presenter (WCAU, WABD, NBC), cerebral hemorrhage from a fall.
Dee Molenaar, 101, American mountaineer and writer.
James Mollison, 88, Australian arts administrator, director of the National Gallery of Australia (1971–1989) and the National Gallery of Victoria (1989–1995).
Nanjil Nalini, 76, Indian actress.
Ikkō Narahara, 88, Japanese photographer.
Joe Steve Ó Neachtain, 77, Irish writer and playwright.
Robert Parker, 89, American R&B singer ("Barefootin'").
Sunanda Patnaik, 85, Indian Gwalior gharana classical singer.
Audrey Rennard, 87, British Olympic gymnast.
Anne Wilson Schaef, 85, American clinical psychologist and author.
Blagovest Sendov, 87, Bulgarian diplomat, mathematician and politician, Chairperson of the National Assembly (1995–1997) and ambassador to Japan (2004–2009).
Ali Mardan Shah, 63, Pakistani politician, member of the Provincial Assembly of Sindh (2002–2018), cardiac arrest.
Shin Kyuk-ho, 98, South Korean businessman, founder of Lotte Corporation.
Sher Bahadur Singh, 87, Indian politician.
Man Sood, 80, Indian cricketer (national team).
Danny Talbott, 75, American football player (Washington Redskins), cancer.
Allah Thérèse, Ivorian traditional musician.
Guy Thomas, 85, Belgian-born French songwriter.
Leonard Woodley, 92, British barrister.

20
Steph Bowe, 25, Australian author and blogger, T-lymphoblastic lymphoma.
Nedda Casei, 87, American operatic mezzo-soprano.
Franck Delhem, 83, Belgian Olympic fencer (1960).
Gilles Delouche, 71, French literary scholar.
Raymond D. Fogelson, 86, American anthropologist.
Wolfgang J. Fuchs, 74, German author, historian and comic book translator.
Jay Hankins, 84, American baseball player (Kansas City Athletics).
Wendy Havran, 64, American immunologist, complications from a heart attack.
Kit Hood, 76, British-born Canadian television producer (Degrassi).
Bill Kaiserman, 77, American fashion designer, complications from a stroke and pneumonia.
Emory Kemp, 88, American civil engineer and industrial archaeologist.
Jaroslav Kubera, 72, Czech politician, President of the Senate (since 2018) and mayor of Teplice (1994–2018).
Reijo Kuistila, 88, Finnish Olympic equestrian.
Richard L. Lawson, 90, American Air Force general.
Bicks Ndoni, 61, South African politician, chief whip of Nelson Mandela Bay Metropolitan Municipality (since 2018), heart attack.
Ulf Norrman, 84, Swedish Olympic sailor (1968).
Gyanendra Nath Pande, Indian engineer.
Roy Piovesana, 77, Canadian historian, heart attack.
Tom Railsback, 87, American politician, member of the Illinois (1962–1966) and U.S. House of Representatives (1967–1983).
Joe Shishido, 86, Japanese actor (Youth of the Beast, Branded to Kill, A Tale of Sorrow and Sadness).
Michael I. Sovern, 88, American legal scholar and academic administrator, President of Columbia University (1980–1993), amyloid cardiomyopathy.
Shamsher Singh Surjewala, 87, Indian politician, MLA (1967–1972, 1977–1987, 1991–1992, 2005–2009), MP (1992–1998).
Mick Vinter, 65, English footballer (Notts County, Wrexham, Oxford United).
Henry C. Wente, 83, American mathematician, complications from pneumonia.

21
Paul Addison, 76, British author and historian.
Norman Amadio, 91, Canadian jazz pianist and bandleader.
Larry Amar, 47, American Olympic field hockey player (1996) and manager.
Katerina Anghelaki-Rooke, 80, Greek poet and academic.
Hédi Baccouche, 90, Tunisian politician, Prime Minister (1987–1989).
Herbert Baumann, 94, German composer.
Eugène Berger, 59, Luxembourgish politician, MP (1994–2004, since 2007).
Bandar bin Muhammad Al Saud, 95, Saudi prince.
John R. Buckley, 88, American politician, Massachusetts state representative (1965–1975), Massachusetts Secretary of Administration and Finance (1975–1979).
Hank Burnine, 87, American football player (Philadelphia Eagles).
James Chesebro, 75, American communication theorist.
Sébastien Demorand, 50, French journalist, cancer.
Terry Jones, 77, Welsh comic actor, screenwriter and film director (Monty Python), frontotemporal dementia.
Patrick Kennedy, 78, Irish politician, Senator (1981–1982, 1983–1993).
Hermann Korte, 71, German academic.
Shuchi Kubouchi, 99, Japanese Go player.
Warren Meck, 63, American psychologist.
Zlatko Mesić, 73, Croatian footballer (Dinamo Zagreb).
Vladimir Aleksandrovich Muravyov, 81, Russian military officer, Strategic Missile Forces.
Meritxell Negre, 48, Spanish singer (Peaches & Herb), cancer.
Gerry Priestley, 88, English footballer (Grimsby Town, Crystal Palace, Halifax Town).
Ismat Ara Sadique, 77, Bangladeshi politician, Minister of Primary and Mass Education (2014) and Public Administration (2014–2018), MP (since 2014).
Ronald Senungetuk, 87, American Iñupiat artist.
Tengiz Sigua, 85, Georgian politician, Prime Minister (1992–1993).
Boris Tsirelson, 69, Russian-Israeli mathematician.
Ian Tuxworth, 77, Australian politician, Chief Minister of the Northern Territory (1984–1986).
Theodor Wagner, 92, Austrian football player (Wacker Wien, national team) and manager (Wacker Innsbruck).
Gloria Weber, 86, American politician, Missouri state representative (1993–1995).
De'Runnya Wilson, 25, American football player (Mississippi State Bulldogs), shot.
Morgan Wootten, 88, American Hall of Fame high school basketball coach (DeMatha Catholic High School).
Fa-Yueh Wu, 88, Chinese mathematician and physicist, emeritus professor at Northeastern University.

22
Hercules Ayala, 69, Puerto Rican professional wrestler (Stampede Wrestling, NJPW, WWC).
Tom Calvin, 93, American football player (Pittsburgh Steelers).
Roser Rahola d'Espona, 105, Spanish editor and baroness.
Sonny Grosso, 89, German-born American police detective, actor and television producer (The French Connection, Night Heat).
John Karlen, 86, American actor (Daughters of Darkness, Dark Shadows, Cagney & Lacey), heart failure.
John Kasper, 73, New Zealand cricketer (Auckland, Natal).
Gerda Kieninger, 68, German politician, member of the Landtag of North Rhine-Westphalia (1995–2017).
Salvatore Laudani, 72, Italian Olympic weightlifter.
Oskar Leupi, 87, Swiss Olympic runner.
George F. MacDonald, 81, Canadian anthropologist, director of Canadian Museum of Civilization (1983–1998).
Julius Montgomery, 90, American aerospace engineer and politician.
John Douglas Morrison, 85, Australian police officer.
Paul Murphy, 87, American politician and judge, Massachusetts state representative (1961–1974).
John S. Pobee, 82, Ghanaian theologian.
Sandor Rivnyak, 82, American Olympic handball player.
Bertrand Teyou, 50, Cameroonian author.
Addy Valero, 50, Venezuelan politician, National Assembly Deputy (since 2016), uterine cancer.
Ralph Weymouth, 102, American Vice Admiral and anti-nuclear activist.
M. Crawford Young, 88, American political scientist, complications from heart failure.

23
Robert Archibald, 39, Scottish basketball player (Memphis Grizzlies, Toronto Raptors, Club Joventut Badalona).
Sir Frederick Ballantyne, 83, Vincentian cardiologist, Governor-General (2002–2019).
Clayton Christensen, 67, American business theorist, cancer.
Hester Diamond, 91, American art collector, breast cancer.
Tom Daley, 86, English footballer (Grimsby Town).
Fernand Daoust, 93, Canadian trade unionist, President of the Fédération des travailleurs et travailleuses du Québec (1991–1993).
Frank Froehling, 77, American tennis player, lymphocytic leukemia.
Jake Godbold, 86, American politician, mayor of Jacksonville, Florida (1978–1987).
Robert Harper, 68, American actor (Frank's Place, Once Upon a Time in America, Twins), cancer.
Adolf Holl, 89, Austrian theologian.
Ricarda Jacobi, 96, German painter.
Stephen James Joyce, 87, Irish literary executor of James Joyce.
Alfred Körner, 93, Austrian football player (Rapid Wien, national team) and manager (First Vienna).
Marsha Kramer, 74, American actress (Modern Family).
Jim Lehrer, 85, American journalist (PBS NewsHour).
Thaddeus F. Malanowski, 97, American priest, Deputy Chief of Chaplains of the United States Army.
Franz Mazura, 95, Austrian operatic bass-baritone, Grammy winner (1981, 1986).
Michele McDonald, 67, American model and beauty pageant contestant, Miss USA 1971.
Patrick Mitchell, 89, British Anglican priest, Dean of Wells (1973–1989) and Windsor (1989–1997).
Gourahari Naik, 60, Indian politician, MLA (2000–2009).
Adolfo Natalini, 78, Italian architect (Superstudio).
Ashish Parmar, 40, Indian photographer, complications from a heart attack.
Gudrun Pausewang, 91, German author (The Last Children of Schewenborn, Die Wolke).
Barbara Remington, 90, American artist and illustrator.
Peter Salama, 51, Australian epidemiologist and WHO official, heart attack.
Jean-Noël Tremblay, 93, Canadian politician.
Kalevi Tuominen, 92, Finnish Hall of Fame basketball player (Tampereen Pyrintö), coach (national team) and executive.
Armando Uribe, 86, Chilean writer and diplomat, Ambassador to China (1971–1973) and winner of the National Prize for Literature (2004).
Herbert Voelcker, 90, American Olympic sports shooter (1956).

24
David Adam, 83, British priest and author.
Nusrat Badr, Indian lyricist ("Dola Re Dola").
Duje Bonačić, 90, Croatian rower, Olympic champion (1952).
Georges Castera, 83, Haitian poet and writer.
José Luis Castro Medellín, 81, Mexican Roman Catholic prelate, Bishop of Tacámbaro (2002–2014).
Chai Chidchob, 92, Thai politician, President of the National Assembly (2008–2011).
Fernando Cordero Rusque, 80, Chilean military officer and politician, General Director of Carabineros (1995–1997) and Senator (1998–2006).
Gene Corrigan, 91, American Hall of Fame lacrosse player, coach (Washington and Lee Generals, Virginia Cavaliers) and college athletics administrator (Notre Dame Fighting Irish).
Sheldon Drobny, 74, American accountant and founder of the Air America radio network.
Robert Erwin, 85, American jurist, Justice of the Alaska Supreme Court (1970–1977), complications from heart failure.
John Fry, 90, American journalist, heart attack.
Aenne Goldschmidt, 99, Swiss expressionist dancer and choreographer.
Herman Goldstein, 88, American criminologist.
Carl Holm, 92, Danish footballer.
Kennedy Isles, 28, Saint Kitts and Nevis footballer, shot.
Leila Janah, 37, American entrepreneur, founder of Samasource, epithelioid sarcoma.
Yuri Viktorovich Kuznetsov, 73, Russian military officer, Hero of the Soviet Union.
Li Fanghua, 88, Chinese physicist, member of the Chinese Academy of Sciences.
Margo Lion, 75, American theatre producer (Hairspray), brain aneurysm.
Seamus Mallon, 83, Northern Irish Gaelic footballer (Middletown) and politician, Senator (1982) and Deputy First Minister (1998–2001).
Horst Meyer, 77, German rower, Olympic gold medalist (1968).
Justice Pain, 41, American professional wrestler (CZW), suicide by jumping.
Joe Payne, 35, American heavy metal bassist and guitarist (Divine Heresy, Nile).
Ibsen Pinheiro, 84, Brazilian prosecutor and politician, President of the Chamber of Deputies (1991–1993) and Deputy (1983–1994, 2003–2011), cardiac arrest.
Juan José Pizzuti, 92, Argentine football player (Banfield, Racing Club, national team) and manager.
Sean Reinert, 48, American drummer (Cynic, Death, Æon Spoke).
Rob Rensenbrink, 72, Dutch footballer (DWS, Anderlecht, national team), progressive spinal muscular atrophy.
Zsolt Richly, 78, Hungarian animator.
Giovanny Romero Infante, 31, Peruvian journalist and LGBTQ activist.
Jagannath Rout, 77, Indian politician, MLA (1980–1990, 1995–1999), cardiac arrest.
Millard Seldin, 93, American businessman.
Vinay Kumar Sinha, 74, Indian film producer (Chor Police, Andaz Apna Apna, Naseeb).
Pete Stark, 88, American politician and attorney, member of the U.S. House of Representatives (1973–2013).
Edwin Straver, 48, Dutch rally motorcyclist, injuries sustained in race crash.
Melhupra Vero, 86, Indian politician, MP (since 1989).
Wes Wilson, 82, American psychedelic poster artist (Jefferson Airplane, Grateful Dead, Bill Graham), cancer.
Forrest L. Wood, 87, American entrepreneur, founder of Ranger Boats.

25
Antonia Apodaca, 96, American musician and songwriter.
Vasily Bakalov, 90, Russian military engineer and designer (9M113 Konkurs, 2K22 Tunguska, Drozd).
Sir Michael Cummins, 80, British parliamentary official, Serjeant at Arms of the House of Commons (2000–2005).
Siegfried Enns, 95, Canadian politician.
Meredith Etherington-Smith, 73, British fashion journalist, heart attack.
Lorenzo Ghiglieri, 88, American sculptor.
Golok Chandra Goswami, 96, Indian academic and linguist.
Nina Griscom, 65, American model, television host and columnist, amyotrophic lateral sclerosis.
Ip Ching, 83, Chinese martial artist.
Anne Kulle, 76, Swedish actress.
Liang Wudong, 60, Chinese physician, COVID-19.
Otakar Mareček, 76, Czech rower, Olympic bronze medalist (1972).
Bob Markell, 95, American television producer (The Defenders, N.Y.P.D.) and art director (12 Angry Men).
Shirley Murray, 88, New Zealand hymn writer.
Tor Obrestad, 81, Norwegian author.
Narciso Parigi, 92, Italian singer and actor.
Todd Portune, 61, American politician, Hamilton County Commissioner (2001–2019), spinal cancer.
Stephen R. Reed, 70, American politician, member of the Pennsylvania House of Representatives (1975–1980) and mayor of Harrisburg (1982–2010).
Denis Rivière, 75, French painter.
Holger Romander, 98, Swedish civil servant, National Police Commissioner (1978–1987).
Dame Alison Roxburgh, 85, New Zealand women's rights advocate and community leader.
Jordan Sinnott, 25, English footballer (Altrincham, Halifax Town), beaten.
Hartmut Steinecke, 79, German literary critic.
Thuy Thanh Truong, 34, Vietnamese entrepreneur, cancer.
Monique van Vooren, 92, Belgian-born American actress (Tarzan and the She-Devil, Happy Anniversary, Fearless Frank) and dancer, cancer.
Ben Hur Villanueva, 81, Filipino artist.
Clifford Wiens, 93, Canadian architect.
Garbis Zakaryan, 90, Turkish boxer.

26

Jos Bernard, 95, Luxembourgish Olympic gymnast (1948).
Maharaj Kishan Bhan, 72, Indian virologist and paediatrician, cancer.
Vsevolod Chaplin, 51, Russian Orthodox clergyman, stroke.
Alfredo Da Silva, 89, Bolivian-American artist, traffic collision.
Maurice Sanford Fox, 95, American geneticist and molecular biologist.
Lucy Jarvis, 102, American television producer (Family Reunion).
Nathaniel R. Jones, 93, American attorney and jurist, Judge of the U.S. Court of Appeals for the Sixth Circuit (1979–2002).
Gloria Lubkin, 86, American science journalist and editor.
Gordon McLauchlan, 89, New Zealand author, social historian, and television and radio presenter.
Terje Meyer, 77, Norwegian industrial designer.
Michou, 88, French cabaret artist.
Hubert Mingarelli, 64, French writer, cancer.
Santu Mofokeng, 64, South African photographer, progressive supranuclear palsy.
Louis Nirenberg, 94, Canadian-American mathematician, co-developer of Gagliardo–Nirenberg interpolation inequality, Abel Prize winner (2015).
Bob Shane, 85, American singer and guitarist (The Kingston Trio), complications from pneumonia.
Wang Xianliang, 62, Chinese politician, COVID-19.
Notable Americans killed in the Calabasas helicopter crash:
John Altobelli, 56, baseball coach (Orange Coast College).
Kobe Bryant, 41, basketball player (Los Angeles Lakers), Olympic champion (2008, 2012) and Oscar winner (2018).

27
Sharif al Mujahid, 93, Pakistani professor.
Xana Antunes, 55, British-American business journalist, pancreatic cancer.
Ramón Avilés, 68, Puerto Rican baseball player (Boston Red Sox, Philadelphia Phillies).
Lina Ben Mhenni, 36, Tunisian political activist and blogger, kidney disease.
Haakon Bjørklid, 94, Norwegian artist.
Allen Brown, 76, American football player (Green Bay Packers).
Jack Burns, 86, American comedian, actor (The Andy Griffith Show) and screenwriter (The Muppet Show), respiratory failure.
Rathin Datta, 88, Indian physician.
Bernard de Give, 106, Belgian Trappist monk.
Derek Edwards, British rugby league player (Castleford, national team).
Flamarion, 68, Brazilian football player and trainer.
Edvardas Gudavičius, 90, Lithuanian historian.
James Houra, 67, Ivorian painter.
Émile Jung, 78, French chef (Au Crocodile).
Eva Marks, 87, Austrian-born Australian Holocaust survivor.
Lovemore Matombo, 75, Zimbabwean trade unionist, president of ZCTU (2002–2008).
Norbert Moutier, 78, French film director (Dinosaur from the Deep).
Reed Mullin, 53, American rock drummer (Corrosion of Conformity, Teenage Time Killers).
Alberto Naranjo, 78, Venezuelan musician.
Gennaro Olivieri, 77, Italian football player (SPAL, Perugia) and manager (Reggina).
Jason Polan, 37, American artist and illustrator, cancer.
Johnny Ray, 82, American NASCAR driver.
K. Amarnath Shetty, 80, Indian politician, MLA (1983–1998).
Nelly Wicky, 96, Swiss politician, member of the National Council (1971–1975).
Michael W. Wright, 81, American CFL player (Winnipeg Blue Bombers) and business executive, CEO of SuperValu, managing director of Wells Fargo, pneumonia.
Yang Xiaobo, 57, Chinese engineer, politician and business executive, mayor of Huangshi (2009–2014), COVID-19.
Mohammad Zuhdi Nashashibi, 95, Palestinian politician, Finance Minister of the Palestinian National Authority (1994–2002).

28
Julia Breck, 78, British actress (Q...).
Lowry Burgess, American artist.
Chris Doleman, 58, American Hall of Fame football player (Minnesota Vikings, Atlanta Falcons, San Francisco 49ers), glioblastoma.
Marj Dusay, 83, American actress (Guiding Light, The Facts of Life, MacArthur).
Frank Edwards, 69, American politician, mayor of Springfield, Illinois (2010–2011), plane crash.
Narciso Elvira, 52, Mexican baseball player (Milwaukee Brewers), shot.
Paul Farnes, 101, British Royal Air Force flying ace (The Few).
Harriet Frank Jr., 96, American screenwriter (Hud, Norma Rae, The Carey Treatment).
Robert V. Gentry, 86, American Young Earth creationist and nuclear physicist.
Abdul Ghafoor, 60, Indian politician, MLA (1995–2005, since 2010).
Oscar N. Harris, 80, American politician, member of the North Carolina Senate (1998–2002), mayor of Dunn, North Carolina (1987–1995, 2003–2019).
Harry Harrison, 89, American radio personality (WMCA, WABC, WCBS-FM).
Don Hasenmayer, 92, American baseball player (Philadelphia Phillies).
Hergo, 68, French photographer.
Sándor Kaló, 75, Hungarian Olympic handball player (1972) and coach.
Naomi Karungi, 41, Ugandan military officer, helicopter crash.
Théo Klein, 99, French lawyer (Conseil Représentatif des Institutions juives de France).
Irwin Lewis, 80, Australian Indigenous artist.
Jameela Malik, 74, Indian actress (Chottanikkara Amma, Sexilla Stundilla, Nadhiyai Thedi Vandha Kadal).
Othmar Mága, 90, German conductor.
John Mitchell, 82, American baseball player (Birmingham Black Barons, Detroit Stars).
Léon Mokuna, 91, Congolese football player (Sporting, Gent) and manager (national team).
Mohammad Munaf, 84, Pakistani cricketer (national team).
Nicholas Parsons, 96, British actor (Four Feather Falls), radio and television presenter (Just a Minute, Sale of the Century), Rector of the University of St Andrews (1988–1991).
Peter Rogers, 72, British businessman (Babcock International).
Jasper Sanfilippo, 88, American businessman.
Dyanne Thorne, 83, American actress (Ilsa, She Wolf of the SS, Chesty Anderson, USN, Hellhole), pancreatic cancer.

29
Sheikha Ahmed al-Mahmoud, Qatari politician.
Qasim al-Raymi, 41, Yemeni Islamic militant, emir of Al-Qaeda in the Arabian Peninsula (since 2015), drone airstrike.
Michiyo Azusa, 76, Japanese singer and actress, heart attack.
Ruth Butterworth, 85, British-born New Zealand political scientist.
Mike Dancis, 80, Latvian-born Australian Olympic basketball player (1964).
Georges-Hilaire Dupont, 100, French Roman Catholic prelate, Bishop of Pala (1964–1975).
Kim Eastland, 67, American game designer.
Larry Eisenhauer, 79, American football player (Boston Patriots).
Alfred John Ellis, 104, Canadian banker.
Tofig Gasimov, 81, Azerbaijani politician and diplomat, Minister of Foreign Affairs (1992–1993).
Blagoja Georgievski, 69, Macedonian basketball player (Rabotnički) and coach, Olympic silver medallist (1976).
Homero Gómez González, 50, Mexican anti-logging activist, head trauma. (body discovered on this date)
Tushar Kanjilal, 84, Indian social worker.
Irina Laricheva, 55, Russian Olympic trap shooter (2004, 2008).
Eddie Legard, 84, English cricketer (Warwickshire).
Félix Marcilhac, 78, French art historian and collector.
Christoph Meckel, 84, German author and graphic designer.
Dale L. Mortensen, 53, American politician, member of the Montana House of Representatives (since 2014).
Keith Nelson, 77, Scottish-born New Zealand footballer (national team).
Frank Press, 95, American geophysicist, President of the National Academy of Sciences (1981–1993).
Ajmal Sultanpuri, 95, Indian Urdu poet.
Matty Todd, 95, British submariner.
Yannis Tseklenis, 82, Greek fashion designer.

30
Muhammad Abu Khubza, 87, Moroccan theologian and linguist.
John Andretti, 56, American racing driver (NASCAR Cup Series, CART), colon cancer.
Miguel Arroyo, 53, Mexican road racing cyclist, National champion (2000), complications during surgery.
Vidya Bal, 84, Indian feminist writer.
Lucien Barbarin, 63, American jazz trombonist (Preservation Hall Jazz Band), cancer.
Vidmantas Bartulis, 65, Lithuanian composer.
Vitaliy Boiko, 82, Ukrainian lawyer and diplomat, Minister of Justice (1990–1992), Ambassador to Moldova (1993–1994) and Chairman of the Supreme Court (1994–2002).
Larbi Chebbak, 73, Moroccan footballer (Union Sidi Kacem, national team).
Luboš Dobrovský, 87, Czech journalist, politician and dissident, Minister of Defence (1990–1992) and Ambassador to Russia (1996–2000).
Jörn Donner, 86, Finnish writer, film director (Fanny and Alexander, Men Can't Be Raped, Anna) and politician, MP (1987–1995, 2007, 2013–2015), MEP (1996–1999), lung disease.
Gisela Eckhardt, 93, German physicist, co-developer of the Raman laser.
Nello Fabbri, 85, Italian racing cyclist.
Terry Fair, 59, American basketball player (Georgia Bulldogs, Hapoel Tel Aviv, Maccabi Tel Aviv).
Yoshinaga Fujita, 69, Japanese novelist and screenwriter (Adrift in Tokyo), lung cancer.
Ge Hongsheng, 88, Chinese politician, Governor of Zhejiang (1990–1993).
Johannes Geiss, 93, German astrophysicist.
Barrie Gilbert, 82, English-American inventor.
Chanin Hale, 91, American actress (The Red Skelton Show).
Roger Holeindre, 90, French military officer and politician, MP (1986–1988).
Richard Hunstead, 76, Australian astronomer.
Dale Jasper, 56, English footballer (Chelsea, Brighton, Crewe Alexandra).
Ann J. Johanson, 85, American pediatric endocrinologist.
M. Kamalam, 93, Indian politician, MLA (1980–1987).
Pierre-Étienne Laporte, 85, Canadian politician.
Jake MacDonald, 70, Canadian author, fall.
William Mitchell, 94, English sculptor.
Soroku Murata, 92, Japanese violinmaker, cancer.
Z. Obed, 88, Indian politician, MLA (1993–1998, 2003–2008).
Erneido Oliva, 87, Cuban-American military officer (Brigade 2506).
T. S. Raghavendra, 75, Indian actor (Vaidehi Kathirunthal, Chinna Thambi Periya Thambi, Vaazhga Jananayagam), playback singer and music director.
Raymond Reierson, 100, Canadian politician.
Fred Silverman, 82, American Hall of Fame television programmer (CBS, ABC, NBC) and producer, cancer.
Tian Chengren, 93, Chinese actor (Warm Spring), winner of the 1984 Flying Apsaras Award for Outstanding Actor.
Manohar Untwal, 53, Indian politician, MLA (1988–2003, 2008–2014, since 2018) and MP (2014–2018), brain hemorrhage.
Mauro Varela, 78, Spanish banker, lawyer and politician, Deputy (1989–2000) and member of the Parliament of Galicia (1997–2001).
Roland Wlodyka, 81, American racing driver.
Zhang Changshou, 90, Chinese archaeologist, Vice Director of the Institute of Archaeology, Chinese Academy of Social Sciences (1985–1988).

31
Khaled Bichara, 48, Egyptian business executive, CEO of Orascom Telecom Holding (since 2009), traffic collision.
Michel Billière, 76, French rugby union player (Stade Toulousain).
Buck Bounds, 90, American politician.
Alexander Joseph Brunett, 86, American Roman Catholic prelate, Archbishop of Seattle (1997–2010).
Johnny Bumphus, 59, American boxer, WBA junior welterweight champion (1984), cardiac arrest.
Anne Cox Chambers, 100, American media proprietor (Cox Enterprises) and diplomat, Ambassador to Belgium (1977–1981).
Chen Fushou, 88, Indonesian-born Chinese badminton player and coach, Uber Cup winner (1984, 1986).
Louise D. Clement-Hoff, 93, American artist.
Guy Delcourt, 72, French politician, MP (2012–2017) and mayor of Lens (1998–2013).
James Dunn, 92, Australian diplomat.
Mark Dziersk, 60, American industrial designer.
Thomas Fay, 79, American politician and jurist, Rhode Island state representative (1969–1978), Chief Justice of the Rhode Island Supreme Court (1986–1993).
Tony Ford, 77–78, New Zealand lawyer and jurist, Chief Justice of the Kingdom of Tonga (2006–2010).
Delphine Forest, 53, French actress.
*Mary Higgins Clark, 92, American author (A Stranger Is Watching, A Cry in the Night, Remember Me).
Wazi Uddin Khan, 83, Bangladeshi politician, MP (1986–1988, 1996–2001).
Wen Zengxian, 68, Chinese politician, Deputy director-general of the Civil Affairs Department of Hubei Province (1997–2010), COVID-19.
Mirza Khazar, 72, Azerbaijani author and political analyst.
Ram Lakhan Mahato, 74, Indian politician, MLA (1995–2000, 2005–2010), heart attack.
Andrée Melly, 87, English actress (The Brides of Dracula).
Bob Monahan, 91, American ice hockey player (Michigan Tech Huskies).
Miloslav Penner, 47, Czech footballer (SK Dynamo České Budějovice, 1. FK Příbram, Fastav Zlín).
Uma Sambanthan, 90, Malaysian political activist.
Melvin Seeman, 101, American social psychologist.
Janez Stanovnik, 97, Slovenian economist and politician, President (1988–1990).
Gunnar Svensson, 64, Swedish ice hockey player (Björklöven) and coach (Djurgården, Troja/Ljungby), non-Hodgkin lymphoma.
William Thomas, 92, British priest, Archdeacon of Northumberland (1982–1993).
Dalip Kaur Tiwana, 84, Indian author, lung disease.
Katsumasa Uchida, 75, Japanese actor.
Donald J. West, 95, English psychiatrist and parapsychologist.
Yang Xin, 79–80, Chinese art historian and curator, Vice Director of the Palace Museum (1987–2000).
César Zabala, 58, Paraguayan footballer (Cerro Porteño, Talleres, national team), bladder cancer.

References

2020-01
 1